Theo Meding (6 May 1931 – 16 July 1971) was a German speed skater. He competed in two events at the 1952 Winter Olympics.

References

1931 births
1971 deaths
German male speed skaters
Olympic speed skaters of Germany
Speed skaters at the 1952 Winter Olympics
Place of birth missing